Wine palm is a common name for several palm species and may refer to:

Borassus flabellifer, a palm species of tropical Asia
Caryota urens, a palm species of tropical Asia
Pseudophoenix vinifera, a palm species endemic to Hispaniola